Eothrips is a genus of thrips in the family Phlaeothripidae.

Species
 Eothrips annulicornis
 Eothrips citritibia
 Eothrips coimbatorensis
 Eothrips connaticornis
 Eothrips crassicornis
 Eothrips distinctus
 Eothrips gemmiperda
 Eothrips gneticola
 Eothrips laticauda
 Eothrips laticeps
 Eothrips schouteniae
 Eothrips sirumalaiensis
 Eothrips trybomi

References

Phlaeothripidae
Thrips
Thrips genera